Horses Leaving the Sea or Horses Coming Out of the Sea is an 1860 oil on canvas painting by Eugène Delacroix, signed and dated by the artist in 1860 and now in The Phillips Collection in Washington, D.C. Relatively atypical in Delacroix's oeuvre, it shows two horses leaving the sea led by a Moroccan rider, with the town of Tangiers in the background. It was produced for the same art dealer as Arab Horses Fighting in a Stable and is usually regarded as a pair with that work.

Implementation
Eugène Delacroix testified at length to his fascination for the equestrian spectacle in his correspondence, and reserves a large part of his work to Arab horses and riders. Horses Emerging from the Sea is a late painting, made a few years before his death, at the same time as Arabian Horses Fighting in a Stable. Compared to that of the fighting horses, this painting can be considered as a “peaceful counterpoint”. Both works are made for the same dealer, Estienne. This painting is surprising compared to the usual style of the painter. This is one of the very last Moroccan reminiscences among the works of Delacroix.

References

1860 paintings
Horses in art
Paintings by Eugène Delacroix
Paintings in Washington, D.C.
Water in art